Alloperla roberti, the Illinois sawfly or Robert's stonefly, is a species of stonefly in the family Chloroperlidae. It was endemic to Illinois and its type locality was in Rock Island County. It has not been seen since 1860 and is likely extinct.

References

Chloroperlidae
Insects described in 1981
Extinct insects since 1500
Extinct animals of the United States
Endemic fauna of Illinois
Taxonomy articles created by Polbot